WD repeat-containing protein 44 is a protein that in humans is encoded by the WDR44 gene.

References

Further reading